Kerstin Isberg (23 August 1913 – 19 November 1984) was a Swedish swimmer. She competed in the women's 200 metre breaststroke at the 1936 Summer Olympics.

Her father Paul Isberg was an Olympic gold medalist in Men's sailing.

References

External links
 

1913 births
1984 deaths
Olympic swimmers of Sweden
Swimmers at the 1936 Summer Olympics
People from Karlskrona
Swedish female breaststroke swimmers
Sportspeople from Blekinge County
20th-century Swedish women